Charlene Drew Jarvis (born July 31, 1941, in Washington, D.C. as Charlene Rosella Drew) is an American educator and former scientific researcher and politician who served as the president of Southeastern University until March 31, 2009. Jarvis is the daughter of the blood plasma and blood transfusion pioneer Charles Drew.

Life
Jarvis earned her Bachelor of Arts degree from Oberlin College in 1962, a Master of Science degree in psychology from Howard University in 1964, and a Doctor of Philosophy degree in neuropsychology from the University of Maryland, College Park, in 1971.

Ward 4's representative to the Council of the District of Columbia, Arrington Dixon, won the election for chairman of the council in November 1978, leaving the Ward 4 seat vacant. Jarvis won the special election to fill the seat on May 1, 1979. She was then reelected to the council in 1980, 1984, 1988, 1992, and 1996. Jarvis sought reelection again in 2000, but she was defeated in the Democratic primary by Adrian Fenty who also holds degrees from Oberlin and Howard University.

Electoral history

1979

1980

1984

1988

1990

1992

1996

2000

References

External links
 "Charlene Drew Jarvis Papers Finding Aid". Libraries at George Washington University.

1941 births
20th-century American politicians
20th-century American women politicians
African-American educators
African-American people in Washington, D.C., politics
African-American psychologists
African-American women in politics
American women neuroscientists
American neuroscientists
American women psychologists
21st-century American psychologists
Presidents of Southeastern University (Washington, D.C.)
Howard University alumni
Living people
Members of the Council of the District of Columbia
Oberlin College alumni
University of Maryland, College Park alumni
Washington, D.C., Democrats
Women city councillors in the District of Columbia
Women heads of universities and colleges
African-American city council members
20th-century African-American women
20th-century African-American politicians
21st-century African-American people
21st-century African-American women
20th-century American psychologists